is a railway station in the city of Tsuruoka, Yamagata, Japan, operated by East Japan Railway Company (JR East).

Lines

Station layout
The station has two opposed side platforms connected to the station building by a footbridge. The station is unattended.

Platforms

History
Koiwagawa Station opened on February 1, 1950. With the privatization of JNR on April 1, 1987, the station came under the control of JR East.

Surrounding area

Koiwagawa Post Office

See also
List of railway stations in Japan

References

External links

 JR East Station information 

Stations of East Japan Railway Company
Railway stations in Yamagata Prefecture
Uetsu Main Line
Railway stations in Japan opened in 1950
Tsuruoka, Yamagata